Johan ″Jonne″ Aksel Alho (9 February 1907 – 14 September 1982) was a Finnish footballer and a football referee.

Football

Player career 
Alho started his career in the Helsinki working-class side Töölön Vesa, winning the Finnish Workers' Sports Federation's (TUL) Championship in 1930. At the time, the football in Finland was split in two due to the 1918 Finnish Civil War. In 1931, Alho was a member of the TUL football team participating the Workers' Summer Olympiad in Vienna.

In the fall of 1931, three Vesa players, Alho, Valdemar Virtanen and Kurt Weckström, switched to the bourgeois HJK Helsinki. Between 1931 and 1936, Alho played six seasons for HJK in the Finnish top tier Mestaruussarja.

As a referee 
After his playing career, Alho was a FIFA international referee in 1941–1956 and 1958–1961. He officiated 11 internationals including the first round match between Sweden and Norway at the 1952 Summer Olympics. In 1959, Alho refereed Finnish Cup final.

Other sports 
Alho also played bandy for Töölön Vesa, winning the TUL Championship in 1929. As a bandy referee, he officiated the match between Norway and Sweden at the 1952 Winter Olympics where bandy was held as a demonstration sport.

References 

1907 births
1982 deaths
Footballers from Helsinki
Association football defenders
Finnish footballers
Helsingin Jalkapalloklubi players
Mestaruussarja players
Finnish football referees
Olympic football referees
Finnish bandy players
20th-century Finnish people